| tries = {{#expr:
 + 9 + 7 + 7 + 6 + 4 + 10 + 6
 + 11 + 8 + 8 + 6 + 4 + 10 + 9
 + 12 + 8 + 10 + 9 + 11 + 2 + 9
 + 12 + 11 + 14 + 12 + 7 + 7 + 6
 + 7 + 13 + 10 + 14 + 5 + 5 + 7 
 + 8 + 12 + 10 + 9 + 8 + 13 + 10 
 + 11 + 9 + 9 + 7 + 10 + 4 + 11 
 + 12 + 9 + 12 + 7 + 6 + 6 + 6 
 + 6 + 8 + 5 + 8 + 13 + 9 + 5
 + 10 + 13 + 5 + 8 + 9 + 6 + 5 
 + 9 + 5 + 9 + 9 + 10 + 3 
 + 10 + 13 + 8 + 7 + 4 + 7 
 + 7 + 3 + 8 + 8 + 9 
 + 9 + 5 
 + 5 + 8 + 7 + 9 + 7 + 8 + 7 
 + 12 + 6 + 5 + 5 + 3 + 10 + 6 
 + 11 + 7 + 8 
 + 7 + 12 + 12 + 3 + 8 + 7 + 16 
 + 5 + 9 + 6 + 8
 + 7 + 7 + 7 + 9
 + 7 + 9 + 7 + 5 + 10 + 11 + 7 
 + 14 + 10 + 4 + 14 + 5 + 2 + 4 
 + 9 + 10 + 13 + 8 + 8 + 14 + 15 
 + 7 + 6 + 7 + 3 + 11 + 12 + 4 

}}
| top point scorer = 166 – Ashley Groves (Old Redcliffians)
| top try scorer   = 15 – Richard Brown (Redruth)Alexander Howman (Clifton)
 
| prevseason       = 2021–22
| nextseason       = 2023–24
}}

The 2022–23 National League 2 West is the first season of the fourth-tier (west) of the English domestic rugby union competitions; one of three at this level. The others are National League 2 North and National League 2 East. Previously, there were two leagues at level four; National League 2 North and National League 2 South. The champions are promoted to National League 1. The bottom two teams are relegated to Regional 1 Midlands or Regional 1 South West depending on location.

Structure
The league consists of fourteen teams who play the others on a home and away basis, to make a total of 26 matches each. The champions are promoted to National League 1. The bottom two teams are relegated.

The results of the matches contribute points to the league as follows:
 4 points are awarded for a win
 2 points are awarded for a draw
 0 points are awarded for a loss, however
 1 losing (bonus) point is awarded to a team that loses a match by 7 points or fewer
 1 additional (bonus) point is awarded to a team scoring 4 tries or more in a match.

Participating teams and locations

League table

Fixtures & results
Fixtures for the season were announced by the RFU on 13 June 2022.

Round 1

Round 2

Round 3

Round 4

Round 5

Round 6

Round 7

Round 8

Round 9

Round 10

Round 11

Round 12

Round 13

Round 14

Round 15

Round 16

Round 17

Round 18

Rescheduled matches

Rescheduled matches

Round 19

Round 20

Round 21

Round 22

Rescheduled matches

References

External links
 NCA Rugby

National League 2 West
4W
4W